The women's 800 metre freestyle competition at the 2018 Pan Pacific Swimming Championships took place on August 9 at the Tokyo Tatsumi International Swimming Center. The defending champion was Katie Ledecky of United States.

This event was a timed-final where each swimmer swam just once. Early heat was swum at the end of the preliminary heats on that day from slowest to fastest. The fastest timed final heat was swum with the finals.

Records
Prior to this competition, the existing world and Pan Pacific records were as follows:

Results
All times are in minutes and seconds.

The timed final was held on 9 August from 10:00 to the slowest heats and from 17:30 to the fastest heat.

Only two swimmers from each country was classified in the award ranking.

Total ranking

Award ranking

References

2018 Pan Pacific Swimming Championships